Sebastian Schjerve (born 16 March 2000) is a Norwegian freestyle skier who competes internationally.

He competed in the FIS Freestyle Ski and Snowboarding World Championships 2021, where he placed eighth in men's ski big air.

References

2000 births
Living people
Norwegian male freestyle skiers